() is one of 6 urban districts of the prefecture-level city of Fuzhou, the capital of Fujian Province, China. As of 2020, Gulou has a total population of 669,090 residents.

Administrative divisions
Subdistricts:
Huada Subdistrict, Gudong Subdistrict, Guxi Subdistrict, Nanjie Subdistrict, Antai Subdistrict, Dongjie Subdistrict, Shuibu Subdistrict, Wenquan Subdistrict, Wufeng Subdistrict

The only town is Hongshan.

References

County-level divisions of Fujian
Fuzhou